23 Librae b (23 Lib b), also known as HD 134987 b, is an extrasolar Jovian planet discovered in November 1999 orbiting the star 23 Librae. It orbits in its star's habitable zone.

As of 1999, the planet was known to have at least 1.5 times Jupiter's mass. The planet orbits 23 Librae at an average distance of 0.82 AU, which is between that of Venus and the Earth in the Solar System.

References

Libra (constellation)
Exoplanets detected by radial velocity
Exoplanets discovered in 1999
Giant planets in the habitable zone